Sasauli is a census town in Yamunanagar district in the Indian state of Haryana.

Demographics
 India census, Sasouli had a population of 15,753. Males constitute 54% of the population and females 46%. Sasouli has an average literacy rate of 78%, higher than the national average of 59.5%: male literacy is 84%, and female literacy is 71%. In Sasouli, 10% of the population is under 6 years of age.

References

Cities and towns in Yamunanagar district